Mueller, She Wrote is a political podcast hosted by Allison Gill, a military veteran who worked at the United States Department of Veterans Affairs. It mixes comedy, legal commentary and political analysis, from a liberal perspective, and centers on the Mueller investigation. The original co-hosts were San Diego comedians Jordan Coburn and Jaleesa Johnson; the latter has since left the show due to a pay dispute.

While the podcast is comedic in tone, it has been praised for capturing the minute detail of the Mueller investigation. Seth Abramson, in an opinion piece for The Guardian has described it as "an indispensable source of curatorial journalism for many Trump-Russia watchers".

People
The three hosts of the show at its inception were Allison Gill (pseudonymously referred to as "A.G."), Jaleesa Johnson, and Jordan Coburn. Gill's identity was kept confidential to avoid potential violations of the Hatch Act, due to the political nature of the podcast, as Gill was an employee of the United States Department of Veterans Affairs. Gill maintains that her March 2020 termination for medical unfitness was pretextual and retaliatory for her involvement with the podcast.

Jaleesa Johnson left the podcast in late 2019, while Amanda Reeder and Jordan Coburn both moved on to other projects in 2021.  They were replaced by comedian Dana Goldberg and actress Aimee Carrero.

Format
The podcast features multiple recurring segments. These include "Just the Facts", in which Gill recaps and discusses news related to the Special Counsel inquiry and Trump-Russia relations; "Hot Notes", in which Johnson and Coburn do research about Trump and present for discussion their findings; and "Fantasy Indictment League", in which the hosts and listeners speculate about the people who may be indicted in the investigation.

See also
 Lawfare (blog)
Political podcast

References

External links 
 

Political podcasts
Law podcasts
2017 podcast debuts
Audio podcasts
Liberal podcasts